Boy Meets Girl is a 1998 romantic comedy fantasy film directed by Jerry Ciccoritti, starring Sean Astin and Emily Hampshire.

Plot summary
Angelina (Emily Hampshire) is a shy and whimsical waitress forced to leave her home in Italy to be married to a man she is not in love with in order to fulfill a family vow. After Angelina moves into a new neighborhood in Little Italy, Toronto, she is torn with the idea of marrying a man she is not in love with. However, in the days leading up to Valentine's Day, Angelina encounters Mike (Sean Astin) and the two seemingly are shot with Cupid's arrows. Angelina and Mike's searches for love come to an end after realizing how connected they truly are to each other.

Cast 
Sean Astin – Mike
Emily Hampshire – Angelina Milleflores
Kevin McDonald – Jack
Joe Mantegna – Il Magnifico
Kate Nelligan – Mrs. Jones
Sook-Yin Lee- Judy
Mary Long – Aunt Zia
Louis Di Bianco – Cardini
Joseph Scoren – Paolo

Awards and nominations
Genie Award nomination, 2000: Best Achievement in Art Direction/Production Design (John Dondertman and Patricia Cuccia)

References

External links 
 
 
 

1998 films
English-language Canadian films
Canadian romantic comedy films
1998 romantic comedy films
American romantic comedy films
Films directed by Jerry Ciccoritti
1990s English-language films
1990s American films
1990s Canadian films